Frederick Lawrence Jacklitsch (May 24, 1876 – July 18, 1937), was a professional baseball player. He played all or part of thirteen seasons in Major League Baseball between 1900 and 1917, primarily as a catcher. Jacklitsch served as the head coach for Rutgers baseball from 1926-1931, accumulating a record of 43-42.

References

External links

Major League Baseball catchers
Philadelphia Phillies players
Brooklyn Superbas players
New York Highlanders players
Baltimore Terrapins players
Boston Braves players
Philadelphia Athletics (minor league) players
Lyons (minor league baseball) players
Montreal Royals players
Harrisburg Ponies players
Minneapolis Millers (baseball) players
Providence Clamdiggers (baseball) players
York Penn Parks players
Rochester Bronchos players
Rochester Hustlers players
Rutgers Scarlet Knights baseball coaches
Sportspeople from Brooklyn
Baseball players from New York City
Baseball players from New York (state)
1876 births
1937 deaths
19th-century baseball players
Burials at Green-Wood Cemetery